Shrikrishna Raut is one of the well-known poets of today's Marathi poetry.

Life
He is a professor of commerce in Shivaji College at Akola. He received a PhD in Korku folk songs in 2006.

Poetry
Two collections of poetry are published in Marathi. Mostly he is known for his Gazals.

External links
माझी गझल मराठी:डॉ.श्रीकृष्ण राऊत
डॉ.श्रीकृष्ण राऊत यांच्या कविता
गाथा मराठी मनाच्या:डॉ.श्रीकृष्ण राऊत

Indian male poets
Marathi-language writers
Marathi-language poets
Living people
Poets from Maharashtra
Year of birth missing (living people)